Suresh Bhardwaj may refer to:
 Suresh Bhardwaj, is an Indian theatre, film and television director
 Suresh Bhardwaj (Politician), is an Indian politician, member of the Bharatiya Janata Party and a member of the Himachal Pradesh Legislative Assembly.